William Harkin (1831 – 1881) was an Ontario doctor and political figure. He represented Prescott in the Legislative Assembly of Ontario from 1875 to 1881 as a Conservative member.

He was born in Hawkesbury, Ontario in 1831, the son of Irish immigrants. He studied medicine at McGill University and qualified to practice in 1858. In 1859, he married Eliza McDonell. He served as reeve for Vankleek Hill. Harkin died in office in 1881.

His son James served as Canada's first commissioner of national parks.

References 
 Histoire des Comtes Unis de Prescott et de Russell, L. Brault (1963)

External links 

The Canadian parliamentary companion and annual register, 1880, CH Mackintosh

1831 births
1881 deaths
People from Hawkesbury, Ontario
Progressive Conservative Party of Ontario MPPs